Quissanga may refer to:

Quissanga District, Mozambique
Bartolomeu Jacinto Quissanga, an Angolan footballer who plays defender for Lazio
Fernando Jacinto Quissanga, an Angolan footballer who plays for FC Rostov.